Ballinakil is a small, sparsely populated townland, located in County Wicklow, Ireland. It is situated off the Glenealy-Rathdrum road, close to Deputy's Pass.

Townlands of County Wicklow